Epigrimyia is a genus of bristle flies in the family Tachinidae.

Species
Epigrimyia illinoensis Robertson, 1901
Epigrimyia polita Townsend, 1891

References

Dexiinae
Taxa named by Charles Henry Tyler Townsend
Diptera of North America
Tachinidae genera